The 2010 FIA GT1 Navarra round was an auto racing event held at the Circuito de Navarra, Los Arcos, Spain on 23–24 October 2010, and served as the eighth round of the 2010 FIA GT1 World Championship season.  The eighth round of the championship had originally been scheduled to be held in Durban, South Africa, but difficulties in completing the circuit in time forced the Fédération Internationale de l'Automobile (FIA) to relocate the event to Navarra.  The event shared the weekend with the Superleague Formula series.

Brazilian Ricardo Zonta and German Frank Kechele of the Reiter Lamborghini team swept the weekend, earning pole position and victories in both the Qualifying and Championship Races.  Frédéric Makowiecki and Yann Clairay of Hexis Aston Martin finished the Championship Race in second, while Warren Hughes and Jamie Campbell-Walter of Sumo Power Nissan were third.  Championship leaders Michael Bartels and Andrea Bertolini of Vitaphone Maserati were able to extend their points lead with a sixth-place finish.

Qualifying

Qualifying result
For qualifying, Driver 1 participates in the first and third sessions while Driver 2 participates in only the second session.  The fastest lap for each session is indicated with bold.

Qualifying Race

Race result

Championship Race

Race result

References

External links
 Navarra GT1 Race in Spain – FIA GT1 World Championship

Navarra
FIA GT1